Giuseppe Molinari (born 1918) was an Italian equestrian. He competed in two events at the 1956 Summer Olympics.

References

External links
 

1918 births
Possibly living people
Italian male equestrians
Olympic equestrians of Italy
Equestrians at the 1956 Summer Olympics
Place of birth missing (living people)